Giulia Jones (born 1980) is an Australian politician. She was a member of the Australian Capital Territory Legislative Assembly representing the electorate of Murrumbidgee for the Liberal Party from 2012 until her resignation in 2022. Jones was the deputy leader of the Liberal Party in the ACT from October 2020 to January 2022.

Background
Jones was born in Hobart, Tasmania to a mother of Italian descent and from a Catholic family. Jones often notes that her first name Giulia is spelt with a "G". Jones studied political science and history and graduated with a Bachelor of Arts from the University of Tasmania. She ran a small business, worked in the public service, and as a political staffer for Sophie Mirabella and Tony Abbott. Jones is a mother of six children.

Prior to her election to the ACT Legislative Assembly, she had sought election on three occasions: pre-selection for a Tasmanian Senate seat in 2007; was a Liberal candidate for a Molonglo at the 2008 election; and at the 2010 federal election for the federal seat of Canberra. Following a 2018 reshuffling of the Liberal Party in the ACT's leadership, Jones was the Liberal spokeswoman for police and emergency services, corrections and women.

Career 
Jones was elected to the Legislative Assembly in 2012 representing the electorate of Molonglo. Since November 2012 she has held a large number of shadow ministries and severed on several committees.

On 24 May 2022, Jones announced she would resign from the Legislative Assembly in the next week. She formally resigned to the Speaker on 2 June, and Ed Cocks was elected in a countback on 20 June. Shortly after her resignation, Painaustralia announced that Jones had been appointed as their CEO.

Controversy 
In 2020, Jones had her driver's license suspended for three months for various speeding offences while she was serving in the ACT Legislative Assembly as the Liberal opposition's spokeswoman for police and emergency services. Shane Rattenbury, the Capital Territory's Road Safety Minister, responded by saying Jones had a "blatant disregard for road safety" and called for her resignation. Jones subsequently stated: "After three months of getting around on my bicycle, it's given me some additional perspective and I'm looking forward to starting a-fresh".

This was not the first recorded driving incident by Jones. In early 2020, a local Canberra resident posted on the well known Canberra community Facebook forum "Canberra Drivers" a video of Jones' branded vehicle failing to give way at an intersection, narrowly missing a nearby vehicle.

See also
 2012 Australian Capital Territory general election
Members of the Australian Capital Territory Legislative Assembly, 2012–2016

References

External links

1980 births
Living people
Members of the Australian Capital Territory Legislative Assembly
Liberal Party of Australia members of the Australian Capital Territory Legislative Assembly
University of Tasmania alumni
Australian politicians of Italian descent
Politicians from Hobart
21st-century Australian politicians
21st-century Australian women politicians
Women members of the Australian Capital Territory Legislative Assembly
Women deputy opposition leaders